The 5th Filmfare Awards were held in 1958.

Mother India won 5 awards, including Best Film, Best Director (for Mehboob Khan) and Best Actress (for Meena Kumari), thus becoming the most-awarded film at the ceremony.

Main Awards

Best Film
Mother India

Best Director
Mehboob Khan – Mother India

Best Actor
Dilip Kumar – Naya Daur

Best Actress
Nargis – Mother India

Best Supporting Actor – Male
Raj Mehra – Sharada

Best Supporting Actor – Female
Shyama – Sharada

Best Music Director 
O. P. Nayyar – Naya Daur

Best Story
Akhtar Mirza – Naya Daur

Technical Awards

Best Art Direction
M. R. Acharekar – Pardesi

Best Cinematography
Faredoon A. Irani – Mother India

Best Sound Recording
R. Kaushik – Mother India

Best Editing
Shivaji Awdhut – Sharada

See also
 Filmfare Awards

References

External links
 5th Filmfare awards

Filmfare Awards
Filmfare
1958 in Indian cinema